Below is the list of episodes for the Australian satirical news program Good News Week. The show aired originally from 1996 to 1998 on the ABC before switching to Network Ten (1999–2000, 2008–2012). Originally, episodes were 30 minutes in length (without advertisements) but have extended to approximately 65 minutes (including advertisements).

Series overview

Episodes

Season 1 (1996)
Names shown in bold are the team captain for the episode, where different from the regular captain. Julie McCrossin became permanent captain for team two from episode 14 onwards.

Season 2 (1997)

Season 3 (1998)
Names shown in bold are the team captain for the episode, where different from the regular captain.

Season 4 (1999)

Season 5 (2000)

Season 6 (2008)
Some sources cite the episodes dated 13 October 2008 and later as Season 2, due to it being named as such when it was made available on iTunes.

Season 7 (2009)

Season 8 (2010)

Season 9 (2011)

See also
 List of Good News Week spin-off series episodes

References
 "GNW Episode Guide" (1998). Retrieved 21 July 2009.
"Good News Week Episodes" (2009). Retrieved 29 July 2009.
"Good News Week Episode List" (2009). Retrieved 24 August 2009.
"GNW TV Fans Episode Guide" (2009). Retrieved 6 November 2009.

Criticism of journalism
Lists of Australian non-fiction television series episodes
Lists of Australian comedy television series episodes